The Middlesex Football Association is an organisation that regulates and promotes football, aiming to increase the quantity and quality of participation in the historic area of Middlesex.

History
The Middlesex F.A. was founded in 1883 by the Football Association. Nicholas Lane Jackson, who had helped found the Corinthians in 1882, organised the founding of the association, and became its first chairman. The association left the Football Association in 1907 to join the Amateur Football Association, but it soon returned. 
It moved to its current headquarters at Roxborough Road in Harrow in 1975.
It did not employ any full-time staff until 1992.

Geography
The Middlesex F.A. covers the historic extent of Middlesex and the entirety of the boroughs of Richmond upon Thames and Barnet. This area overlaps with the scope of the London Football Association, the Surrey County Football Association and Hertfordshire County Football Association. This means that many clubs are eligible for affiliation with more than one county football association, such as Ashford Town (Middlesex) who are affiliated to Middlesex and Surrey, and Potters Bar Town who are affiliated to Middlesex and Hertfordshire.

Cups
The Middlesex F.A. organises the following cup competitions:
MFA Senior Challenge Cup, more usually called the Middlesex Senior Cup
MFA Senior Charity Cup, more usually called the Middlesex Senior Charity Cup or simply Middlesex Charity Cup
MFA Ladies Senior Cup
MFA Ladies Junior Cup
MFA Premier Cup
MFA Intermediate Cup
MFA Junior Cup
MFA Junior Trophy
MFA Junior Trophy
MFA Midweek Cup
MFA Sunday Premier Cup
MFA Sunday Intermediate Cup
MFA Sunday Intermediate Cup
MFA Sunday Junior Cup
MFA Sunday Junior Cup
MFA Sunday Junior Trophy
MFA Sunday Junior Trophy
MFA Senior Youth Cup
MFA Youth Under 18 Cup
MFA Youth Under 16 Cup
MFA Youth Under 16 Girls Cup
MFA Youth Under 15 Cup
MFA Youth Under 15 Girls Cup
MFA Youth Under 14 Cup
MFA Youth Under 14 Cup
MFA Youth Under 14 Girls Cup
MFA Youth Under 13 Cup
MFA Youth Under 13 Cup
MFA Youth Under 13 Girls Cup
MFA Youth Under 12 Cup
MFA Youth Under 11 Cup

References

External links

Harrow Council
Middlesex County Football Association photos

County football associations
1883 establishments in England
Football in London
Sports organizations established in 1883
Sport in Middlesex